The S. M. Budyonny Military Academy of the Signal Corps is a military university in Saint Petersburg, Russian Federation, founded in 1919. The academy trains officers for service in the Signal Troops of the Russian Ground Forces.

History 
 1919 (8 November). Foundation of the academy. Initial name: Electro-technical high school for commanding officers of the workers' and peasants' Red Army
 1941 (21 January).  By order of the People’s Commissar of Defence of the USSR this military college was renamed to Military Academy of Signal Technology.
 1946 (5 July). The Military academy received the name of honour S. M. Budyonny.
 1998 (29 August). By decree №1009 of the Government of Russia the Military academy received the status of a Military university.

Awards 
The military academy was many times distinguished and awarded as follows:
 November, 7th 1944 with the Order of the Red Banner
 February, 22nd 1968 with the Order of Lenin

Subjects / purpose of study 
Academic qualification (university degree) for officers attached for special duties. 
Special subjects
 210401 — Physics and communications technology of optoelectronics
 210404 — Multichannel telecommunication’s systems
 210405 — Radio engineering, broadcasting (BC) and television (TV)
 210406 — Communications networks and electronic switching systems (ESS)
 230101 — Computing technology, complex installations, systems and networks
 230102 — IT-systems and automated command and control systems
 230105 — Programming of computer systems and of automated systems

The duration of study is 5 years. Instruction takes place daily around the clock.

Heads of the Academy 
 1919—1921 — A.V. Babinski (ru: А.В. Бабински)
 1921—1922 — E.A. Bernardelli (ru: E.A. Бернарделли)
 1922—1927 — A.A. Ovchinikov (ru: A.A Овчиников)
 1928—1932 — Professor E.A. Svirsky (ru: E.A. Свирский)
 1932—1937 — K.E. Polishchuk (ru: K.E. Полищук)
 1937—1938 — M.I. Dratvin (ru: M.И. Дратвин)
 1938—1938 — N.N. Andreyev (ru: H.H. Андреев)
 1938—1942 — Lieutenant General  V.M. Govyadkin (ru: B.M. Говядкин)
 1942—1944 — Major General A.G. Lapkin (ru: A.Г. Лaпкин)
 1944—1949 — Lieutenant General K.Kh. Muravyev (ru: К.Х. Муравьев)
 1949—1951 — Lieutenant General  P.D. Miroshnikov (ru:  П.Д. Мирошников)
 1951—1961 — Lieutenant General V.V. Zvenigorodsky (ru: B.B. Звенигородский) 
 1961—1974 — Colonel General A.A. Frolov (ru: А.А. Фролов)
 1974—1978 — Lieutenant General A.P. Borisov (ru: А.П. Борисов)
 1978—1988 — Lieutenant General N.G. Popov (ru: Н.Г. Попов)
 1988—1991 — Lieutenant General P.N. Barashkov (ru: П.Н.Барашков)
 1991—1995 — Lieutenant General G.G. Savin (ru: Г.Г. Савин)
 1995—1998 — Lieutenant General S.P. Liguta (ru: С.Р. Лигута)
 1998—2003 — Lieutenant General E.A. Karpov (ru: Е.А. Карпов)
 2003—2009 — Lieutenant General A.L. Kremenchutsky (ru: А.Л. Кременчуцкий)
 2009—2011 — Major General S.A. Budilkin (ru: С.А. Будилкин)
 2011— ... — Major General S.V. Kostarev (ru: С.В. Костарев)

Famous graduates and lecturers 
 Vladimir Varyukhin - the listener (10.07.1945 — 23.05.1951) and the lecturer (23.05.1951 — 18.11.1961) 
  (1920—2000), Hero of the Russian Federation. From April to October 1943 — student (intensive course) on the Command-Engineer-Faculty of the Military Academy of Signal Technology (at that time — evacuated to the town of Tomsk).

See also
Russian Signal Troops

External links 
 Homepage of the Military Academy of the Signal Corps, S. M. Budjonny 

1919 establishments in Russia
Military academies of Russia
Military academies of the Soviet Army
Universities in Saint Petersburg
Military high schools